The 1949 Montreal Alouettes finished the season in 2nd place in the Interprovincial Rugby Football Union with an 8–4 record and won the Grey Cup.

Preseason

Regular season

Standings

Schedule

Postseason

Grey Cup

Awards and honours

References

External links
Official Site

Montreal Alouettes seasons
Grey Cup championship seasons
James S. Dixon Trophy championship seasons
1949 Canadian football season by team
1940s in Montreal